Moez Zemzemi (August 18, 1975-May 1, 2012) is a boxer from Tunisia. He represented his native North African country at the 2000 Summer Olympics in Sydney, Australia. There he was stopped in the first round of the men's bantamweight (– 54 kg) competition by Cuba's eventual gold medalist Guillermo Rigondeaux.

References
Moez Zemzemi's profile at Sports Reference.com

1975 births
2012 deaths
Flyweight boxers
Bantamweight boxers
Boxers at the 2000 Summer Olympics
Olympic boxers of Tunisia
Tunisian male boxers

Mediterranean Games bronze medalists for Tunisia
Competitors at the 2001 Mediterranean Games
African Games bronze medalists for Tunisia
African Games medalists in boxing
Mediterranean Games medalists in boxing
Competitors at the 1999 All-Africa Games
20th-century Tunisian people
21st-century Tunisian people